Kim Byung-sun (3 January 1973 – 21 February 1995) was a South Korean male volleyball player. He was part of the South Korea men's national volleyball team. He competed in the men's tournament at the 1992 Summer Olympics. He played for Sungkyunkwan University.

Clubs
 Sungkyunkwan University (1994)
 Hyundai (1995)

References

1973 births
1995 deaths
South Korean men's volleyball players
Sportspeople from Busan
Sungkyunkwan University alumni
Asian Games medalists in volleyball
Volleyball players at the 1994 Asian Games
Medalists at the 1994 Asian Games
Asian Games bronze medalists for South Korea
Olympic volleyball players of South Korea
Volleyball players at the 1992 Summer Olympics
20th-century South Korean people